Shahzada Freydoun Mirza Qajar (22 January 1922 – 24 September 1975) was a member of the Qajar dynasty.

Biography
Freydoun Qajar was born at the Golestan Palace, Tehran, on 22 January 1922. He was educated from the University of Geneva in Switzerland. In his last will, written in his own hand in French, Ahmad Shah Qajar willed Freydoun Mirza be his heir and crown prince. The point, however, was not pressed by Fereydoun Mirza's trustees, for personal and familial reasons. Mohammad Hassan Mirza retained the title of crown prince and declared himself Shah in exile in 1930. Freydoun was the Head of the Imperial House of Qajar after the death of his father on 27 February 1930. Freydoun died at Geneva, having had three children, one son Teymour and two daughters Cheyda and Eylah (not in the line of succession).

External links
qajarpages.org

1922 births
1975 deaths
Fereydoun
Heads of the Qajar Imperial Family
Iranian emigrants to Switzerland
Heirs apparent who never acceded